Kornelia Greßler (born 9 November 1970), usually spelled Kornelia Gressler in English, is a retired East German swimmer who won three medals at the 1985 European Aquatics Championships: gold in the 4×100 m medley relay and gold in the 100 m and silver in the 200 m butterfly events. She repeated this achievement at the 1986 World Aquatics Championships. In 1985, she set a European record in the 100 m butterfly (59.35) that stood for more than 10 years.

References

1970 births
Living people
German female swimmers
Female butterfly swimmers
World Aquatics Championships medalists in swimming
European Aquatics Championships medalists in swimming
People from Arnstadt
Sportspeople from Thuringia